Roman Nikolayevich Kuzovkin (born 19 October 1994) is a Russian football midfielder.

Club career
He made his debut in the Russian Professional Football League for FC Metallurg Lipetsk on 15 April 2014 in a game against FC Metallurg Vyksa.

References

External links
 
 
 

1994 births
Sportspeople from Lipetsk
Living people
Russian footballers
Association football midfielders
Russian expatriate footballers
FC Metallurg Lipetsk players
FC Volga Nizhny Novgorod players
Expatriate footballers in Belarus
FC Slavia Mozyr players
FC Dynamo Bryansk players
Belarusian Premier League players